Maurits Cornelis Escher (17 June 1898 – 27 March 1972) was a Dutch graphic artist who made mathematically inspired woodcuts, lithographs, and mezzotints.
Despite wide popular interest, Escher was for most of his life neglected in the art world, even in his native Netherlands. He was 70 before a retrospective exhibition was held. In the late twentieth century, he became more widely appreciated, and in the twenty-first century he has been celebrated in exhibitions around the world.

His work features mathematical objects and operations including impossible objects, explorations of infinity, reflection, symmetry, perspective, truncated and stellated polyhedra, hyperbolic geometry, and tessellations. Although Escher believed he had no mathematical ability, he interacted with the mathematicians George Pólya, Roger Penrose, Harold Coxeter and crystallographer Friedrich Haag, and conducted his own research into tessellation.

Early in his career, he drew inspiration from nature, making studies of insects, landscapes, and plants such as lichens, all of which he used as details in his artworks. He traveled in Italy and Spain, sketching buildings, townscapes, architecture and the tilings of the Alhambra and the Mezquita of Cordoba, and became steadily more interested in their mathematical structure.

Escher's art became well known among scientists and mathematicians, and in popular culture, especially after it was featured by Martin Gardner in his April 1966 Mathematical Games column in Scientific American. Apart from being used in a variety of technical papers, his work has appeared on the covers of many books and albums. He was one of the major inspirations of Douglas Hofstadter's Pulitzer Prize-winning 1979 book Gödel, Escher, Bach.

Early life 

   
Maurits Cornelis Escher was born on 17 June 1898 in Leeuwarden, Friesland, the Netherlands, in a house that forms part of the Princessehof Ceramics Museum today. He was the youngest son of the civil engineer George Arnold Escher and his second wife, Sara Gleichman. In 1903, the family moved to Arnhem, where he attended primary and secondary school until 1918. Known to his friends and family as "Mauk", he was a sickly child and was placed in a special school at the age of seven; he failed the second grade. Although he excelled at drawing, his grades were generally poor. He took carpentry and piano lessons until he was thirteen years old.

In 1918, he went to the Technical College of Delft. From 1919 to 1922, Escher attended the Haarlem School of Architecture and Decorative Arts, learning drawing and the art of making woodcuts. He briefly studied architecture, but he failed a number of subjects (due partly to a persistent skin infection) and switched to decorative arts, studying under the graphic artist Samuel Jessurun de Mesquita.

Study journeys 

In 1922, an important year of his life, Escher traveled through Italy, visiting Florence, San Gimignano, Volterra, Siena, and Ravello. In the same year, he traveled through Spain, visiting Madrid, Toledo, and Granada. He was impressed by the Italian countryside and, in Granada, by the Moorish architecture of the fourteenth-century Alhambra. The intricate decorative designs of the Alhambra, based on geometrical symmetries featuring interlocking repetitive patterns in the coloured tiles or sculpted into the walls and ceilings, triggered his interest in the mathematics of tessellation and became a powerful influence on his work.

Escher returned to Italy and lived in Rome from 1923 to 1935. While in Italy, Escher met Jetta Umiker – a Swiss woman, like himself attracted to Italy – whom he married in 1924. The couple settled in Rome where their first son, Giorgio (George) Arnaldo Escher, named after his grandfather, was born. Escher and Jetta later had two more sons – Arthur and Jan.

He travelled frequently, visiting (among other places) Viterbo in 1926, the Abruzzi in 1927 and 1929, Corsica in 1928 and 1933, Calabria in 1930, the Amalfi coast in 1931 and 1934, and Gargano and Sicily in 1932 and 1935. The townscapes and landscapes of these places feature prominently in his artworks. In May and June 1936, Escher travelled back to Spain, revisiting the Alhambra and spending days at a time making detailed drawings of its mosaic patterns. It was here that he became fascinated, to the point of obsession, with tessellation, explaining:

The sketches he made in the Alhambra formed a major source for his work from that time on. He also studied the architecture of the Mezquita, the Moorish mosque of Cordoba. This turned out to be the last of his long study journeys; after 1937, his artworks were created in his studio rather than in the field. His art correspondingly changed sharply from being mainly observational, with a strong emphasis on the realistic details of things seen in nature and architecture, to being the product of his geometric analysis and his visual imagination. All the same, even his early work already shows his interest in the nature of space, the unusual, perspective, and multiple points of view.

Later life 

In 1935, the political climate in Italy under Mussolini became unacceptable to Escher. He had no interest in politics, finding it impossible to involve himself with any ideals other than the expressions of his own concepts through his own particular medium, but he was averse to fanaticism and hypocrisy. When his eldest son, George, was forced at the age of nine to wear a Ballila uniform in school, the family left Italy and moved to Château-d'Œx, Switzerland, where they remained for two years.

The Netherlands post office had Escher design a semi-postal stamp for the "Air Fund" (Dutch: Het Nationaal Luchtvaartfonds) in 1935, and again in 1949 he designed Dutch stamps. These were for the 75th anniversary of the Universal Postal Union; a different design was used by Suriname and the Netherlands Antilles for the same commemoration.

Escher, who had been very fond of and inspired by the landscapes in Italy, was decidedly unhappy in Switzerland. In 1937 the family moved again, to Uccle (Ukkel), a suburb of Brussels, Belgium. World War II forced them to move in January 1941, this time to Baarn, Netherlands, where Escher lived until 1970. Most of Escher's best-known works date from this period. The sometimes cloudy, cold, and wet weather of the Netherlands allowed him to focus intently on his work. After 1953, Escher lectured widely. A planned series of lectures in North America in 1962 was cancelled after an illness, and he stopped creating artworks for a time, but the illustrations and text for the lectures were later published as part of the book Escher on Escher. He was awarded the Knighthood of the Order of Orange-Nassau in 1955; he was later made an Officer in 1967.

In July 1969 he finished his last work, a large woodcut with threefold rotational symmetry called Snakes, in which snakes wind through a pattern of linked rings. These shrink to infinity toward both the center and the edge of a circle. It was exceptionally elaborate, being printed using three blocks, each rotated three times about the center of the image and precisely aligned to avoid gaps and overlaps, for a total of nine print operations for each finished print. The image encapsulates Escher's love of symmetry; of interlocking patterns; and, at the end of his life, of his approach to infinity. The care that Escher took in creating and printing this woodcut can be seen in a video recording.

Escher moved to the Rosa Spier Huis in Laren in 1970, an artists' retirement home in which he had his own studio. He died in a hospital in Hilversum on 27 March 1972, aged 73. He is buried at the New Cemetery in Baarn.

Mathematically inspired work 

Escher's work is inescapably mathematical. This has caused a disconnect between his full-on popular fame and the lack of esteem with which he has been viewed in the art world. His originality and mastery of graphic techniques are respected, but his works have been thought too intellectual and insufficiently lyrical. Movements such as conceptual art have, to a degree, reversed the art world's attitude to intellectuality and lyricism, but this did not rehabilitate Escher, because traditional critics still disliked his narrative themes and his use of perspective. However, these same qualities made his work highly attractive to the public.

Escher is not the first artist to explore mathematical themes: Parmigianino (1503–1540) had explored spherical geometry and reflection in his 1524 Self-portrait in a Convex Mirror, depicting his own image in a curved mirror, while William Hogarth's 1754 Satire on False Perspective foreshadows Escher's playful exploration of errors in perspective. Another early artistic forerunner is Giovanni Battista Piranesi (1720–1778), whose dark "fantastical" prints such as The Drawbridge in his Carceri ("Prisons") sequence depict perspectives of complex architecture with many stairs and ramps, peopled by walking figures. Escher greatly admired Piranesi and had several of Piranesi's prints hanging in his studio.

Only with 20th century movements such as Cubism, De Stijl, Dadaism, and Surrealism did mainstream art start to explore Escher-like ways of looking at the world with multiple simultaneous viewpoints. However, although Escher had much in common with, for example, Magritte's surrealism and Op art, he did not make contact with any of these movements.

Tessellation 

In his early years Escher sketched landscapes and nature. He also sketched insects such as ants, bees, grasshoppers, and mantises, which appeared frequently in his later work. His early love of Roman and Italian landscapes and of nature created an interest in tessellation, which he called Regular Division of the Plane; this became the title of his 1958 book, complete with reproductions of a series of woodcuts based on tessellations of the plane, in which he described the systematic buildup of mathematical designs in his artworks. He wrote, "Mathematicians have opened the gate leading to an extensive domain".

After his 1936 journey to the Alhambra and to La Mezquita, Cordoba, where he sketched the Moorish architecture and the tessellated mosaic decorations, Escher began to explore the properties and possibilities of tessellation using geometric grids as the basis for his sketches. He then extended these to form complex interlocking designs, for example with animals such as birds, fish, and reptiles. One of his first attempts at a tessellation was his pencil, India ink, and watercolour Study of Regular Division of the Plane with Reptiles (1939), constructed on a hexagonal grid. The heads of the red, green, and white reptiles meet at a vertex; the tails, legs, and sides of the animals interlock exactly. It was used as the basis for his 1943 lithograph Reptiles.

His first study of mathematics began with papers by George Pólya and by the crystallographer Friedrich Haag on plane symmetry groups, sent to him by his brother Berend, a geologist. He carefully studied the 17 canonical wallpaper groups and created periodic tilings with 43 drawings of different types of symmetry. From this point on, he developed a mathematical approach to expressions of symmetry in his artworks using his own notation. Starting in 1937, he created woodcuts based on the 17 groups. His Metamorphosis I (1937) began a series of designs that told a story through the use of pictures. In Metamorphosis I, he transformed convex polygons into regular patterns in a plane to form a human motif. He extended the approach in his piece Metamorphosis III, which is almost seven metres long.

In 1941 and 1942 Escher summarised his findings for his own artistic use in a sketchbook, which he labeled (following Haag) Regelmatige vlakverdeling in asymmetrische congruente veelhoeken ("Regular division of the plane with asymmetric congruent polygons"). The mathematician Doris Schattschneider unequivocally described this notebook as recording "a methodical investigation that can only be termed mathematical research." She defined the research questions he was following as

Geometries 

Although Escher did not have mathematical training – his understanding of mathematics was largely visual and intuitive – his art had a strong mathematical component, and several of the worlds that he drew were built around impossible objects. After 1924 Escher turned to sketching landscapes in Italy and Corsica with irregular perspectives that are impossible in natural form. His first print of an impossible reality was Still Life and Street (1937); impossible stairs and multiple visual and gravitational perspectives feature in popular works such as Relativity (1953). House of Stairs (1951) attracted the interest of the mathematician Roger Penrose and his father, the biologist Lionel Penrose. In 1956, they published a paper, "Impossible Objects: A Special Type of Visual Illusion" and later sent Escher a copy. Escher replied, admiring the Penroses' continuously rising flights of steps, and enclosed a print of Ascending and Descending (1960). The paper also contained the tribar or Penrose triangle, which Escher used repeatedly in his lithograph of a building that appears to function as a perpetual motion machine, Waterfall (1961).

Escher was interested enough in Hieronymus Bosch's 1500 triptych The Garden of Earthly Delights to re-create part of its right-hand panel, Hell, as a lithograph in 1935. He reused the figure of a Mediaeval woman in a two-pointed headdress and a long gown in his lithograph Belvedere in 1958; the image is, like many of his other "extraordinary invented places", peopled with "jesters, knaves, and contemplators". Thus, Escher not only was interested in possible or impossible geometry but was, in his own words, a "reality enthusiast"; he combined "formal astonishment with a vivid and idiosyncratic vision".

Escher worked primarily in the media of lithographs and woodcuts, although the few mezzotints he made are considered to be masterpieces of the technique. In his graphic art, he portrayed mathematical relationships among shapes, figures, and space. Integrated into his prints were mirror images of cones, spheres, cubes, rings, and spirals.

Escher was also fascinated by mathematical objects such as the Möbius strip, which has only one surface. His wood engraving Möbius Strip II (1963) depicts a chain of ants marching forever over what, at any one place, are the two opposite faces of the object—which are seen on inspection to be parts of the strip's single surface. In Escher's own words:

The mathematical influence in his work became prominent after 1936, when, having boldly asked the Adria Shipping Company if he could sail with them as travelling artist in return for making drawings of their ships, they surprisingly agreed, and he sailed the Mediterranean, becoming interested in order and symmetry. Escher described this journey, including his repeat visit to the Alhambra, as "the richest source of inspiration I have ever tapped".

Escher's interest in curvilinear perspective was encouraged by his friend and "kindred spirit", the art historian and artist Albert Flocon, in another example of constructive mutual influence. Flocon identified Escher as a "thinking artist" alongside Piero della Francesca, Leonardo da Vinci, Albrecht Dürer, Wenzel Jamnitzer, Abraham Bosse, Girard Desargues, and Père Nicon. Flocon was delighted by Escher's Grafiek en tekeningen ("Graphics in Drawing"), which he read in 1959. This stimulated Flocon and André Barre to correspond with Escher and to write the book La Perspective curviligne ("Curvilinear perspective").

Platonic and other solids 

Escher often incorporated three-dimensional objects such as the Platonic solids such as spheres, tetrahedrons, and cubes into his works, as well as mathematical objects such as cylinders and stellated polyhedra. In the print Reptiles, he combined two- and three-dimensional images. In one of his papers, Escher emphasized the importance of dimensionality:

Escher's artwork is especially well-liked by mathematicians such as Doris Schattschneider and scientists such as Roger Penrose, who enjoy his use of polyhedra and geometric distortions. For example, in Gravitation, animals climb around a stellated dodecahedron.

The two towers of Waterfall impossible building are topped with compound polyhedra, one a compound of three cubes, the other a stellated rhombic dodecahedron now known as Escher's solid. Escher had used this solid in his 1948 woodcut Stars, which also contains all five of the Platonic solids and various stellated solids, representing stars; the central solid is animated by chameleons climbing through the frame as it whirls in space. Escher possessed a 6 cm refracting telescope and was a keen-enough amateur astronomer to have recorded observations of binary stars.

Levels of reality 
Escher's artistic expression was created from images in his mind, rather than directly from observations and travels to other countries. His interest in the multiple levels of reality in art is seen in works such as Drawing Hands (1948), where two hands are shown, each drawing the other. The critic Steven Poole commented that

Infinity and hyperbolic geometry 

In 1954 the International Congress of Mathematicians met in Amsterdam, and N. G. de Bruin organised a display of Escher's work at the Stedelijk Museum for the participants. Both Roger Penrose and H. S. M. Coxeter were deeply impressed with Escher's intuitive grasp of mathematics. Inspired by Relativity, Penrose devised his tribar, and his father, Lionel Penrose, devised an endless staircase. Roger Penrose sent sketches of both objects to Escher, and the cycle of invention was closed when Escher then created the perpetual motion machine of Waterfall and the endless march of the monk-figures of Ascending and Descending.
In 1957 Coxeter obtained Escher's permission to use two of his drawings in his paper "Crystal symmetry and its generalizations". He sent Escher a copy of the paper; Escher recorded that Coxeter's figure of a hyperbolic tessellation "gave me quite a shock": the infinite regular repetition of the tiles in the hyperbolic plane, growing rapidly smaller towards the edge of the circle, was precisely what he wanted to allow him to represent infinity on a two-dimensional plane.

Escher carefully studied Coxeter's figure, marking it up to analyse the successively smaller circles with which (he deduced) it had been constructed. He then constructed a diagram, which he sent to Coxeter, showing his analysis; Coxeter confirmed it was correct, but disappointed Escher with his highly technical reply. All the same, Escher persisted with hyperbolic tiling, which he called "Coxetering". Among the results were the series of wood engravings Circle Limit I–IV. In 1959, Coxeter published his finding that these works were extraordinarily accurate: "Escher got it absolutely right to the millimeter".

Legacy 

Escher's special way of thinking and rich graphics have had a continuous influence in mathematics and art, as well as in popular culture.

In art collections 

The Escher intellectual property is controlled by the M.C. Escher Company, while exhibitions of his artworks are managed separately by the M.C. Escher Foundation.

The primary institutional collections of original works by M.C. Escher are the Escher Museum in The Hague; the National Gallery of Art (Washington, DC); the National Gallery of Canada (Ottawa); the Israel Museum (Jerusalem); and the Huis ten Bosch (Nagasaki, Japan).

Exhibitions 

Despite wide popular interest, Escher was for a long time somewhat neglected in the art world; even in his native Netherlands, he was 70 before a retrospective exhibition was held. In the twenty-first century, major exhibitions have been held in cities around the world. An exhibition of his work in Rio de Janeiro attracted more than 573,000 visitors in 2011; its daily visitor count of 9,677 made it the most visited museum exhibition of the year, anywhere in the world. No major exhibition of Escher's work was held in Britain until 2015, when the Scottish National Gallery of Modern Art ran one in Edinburgh from June to September 2015, moving in October 2015 to the Dulwich Picture Gallery, London. The exhibition poster is based on Hand with Reflecting Sphere, 1935, which shows Escher in his house reflected in a handheld sphere, thus illustrating the artist, his interest in levels of reality in art (e.g., is the hand in the foreground more real than the reflected one?), perspective, and spherical geometry. The exhibition moved to Italy in 2015–2016, attracting over 500,000 visitors in Rome and Bologna, and then Milan.

In mathematics and science 

Doris Schattschneider identifies eleven strands of mathematical and scientific research anticipated or directly inspired by Escher. These are the classification of regular tilings using the edge relationships of tiles: two-color and two-motif tilings (counterchange symmetry or antisymmetry); color symmetry (in crystallography); metamorphosis or topological change; covering surfaces with symmetric patterns; Escher's algorithm (for generating patterns using decorated squares); creating tile shapes; local versus global definitions of regularity; symmetry of a tiling induced by the symmetry of a tile; orderliness not induced by symmetry groups; the filling of the central void in Escher's lithograph Print Gallery by H. Lenstra and B. de Smit.

The Pulitzer Prize-winning 1979 book Gödel, Escher, Bach by Douglas Hofstadter discusses the ideas of self-reference and strange loops expressed in Escher's art. The asteroid 4444 Escher was named in Escher's honor in 1985.

In popular culture 

Escher's fame in popular culture grew when his work was featured by Martin Gardner in his April 1966 "Mathematical Games" column in Scientific American.  Escher's works have appeared on many album covers including The Scaffold's 1969 L the P with Ascending and Descending; Mott the Hoople's eponymous 1969 record with Reptiles, Beaver & Krause's 1970 In A Wild Sanctuary with Three Worlds; and Mandrake Memorial's 1970 Puzzle with House of Stairs and (inside) Curl Up. His works have similarly been used on many book covers, including some editions of Edwin Abbott's Flatland, which used Three Spheres; E. H. Gombrich's Meditations on a Hobby Horse with Horseman; Pamela Hall's Heads You Lose with Plane Filling 1; Patrick A. Horton's Mastering the Power of Story with Drawing Hands; Erich Gamma et al.'s Design Patterns: Elements of Reusable Object-oriented software with Swans; and Arthur Markman's Knowledge Representation with Reptiles. The "World of Escher" markets posters, neckties, T-shirts, and jigsaw puzzles of Escher's artworks. Both Austria and the Netherlands have issued postage stamps commemorating the artist and his works.

See also 

Victor Vasarely
Escher sentences, named after works like Ascending and Descending

Notes

References

Further reading

Books

Media 

 Escher, M. C. The Fantastic World of M. C. Escher, Video collection of examples of the development of his art, and interviews, Director, Michele Emmer.
 Phoenix Films & Video  Adventures in Perception (1973)

External links 

 
 
 
 
  — physical replicas of some of Escher's "impossible" designs
 
  Copyright issue regarding Escher from the Artquest Artlaw archive.
M. C. Escher Correspondence at the National Gallery of Canada, Ottawa, Ontario.

 
1898 births
1972 deaths
20th-century Dutch artists
Burials in Utrecht (province)
Delft University of Technology alumni
Dutch draughtsmen
Dutch engravers
Dutch illustrators
Dutch male artists
Dutch printmakers
Dutch stamp designers
Dutch wood engravers
Mathematical artists
Modern printmakers
Officers of the Order of Orange-Nassau
People from Leeuwarden
People from Château-d'Œx
20th-century engravers